Topsy (died 1998) was an abused deaf mute Chinese Tartar girl who was adopted by  British missionary Mildred Cable, a Protestant Christian missionary in China, serving with the China Inland Mission, and her friends Evangeline (Eva) French and Francesca French.
Her story is told in the book The Story of Topsy. She was named 'Little Lonely' by her abusive guardian, but the sisters called her 'Topsy'. 
The child could not hear or speak and was sold as a beggar. She was unable to defend herself against attacks from the neighbour's dogs.

After the missionaries brought her to England, she took on the name of Eileen Guy. The French sisters left her their money when they died in 1960 (Eileen was thought to be about 45 at that time), and she lived in Rickmansworth until she died in 1998.

Footnotes

1998 deaths
Child abuse in China
Crimes against children
Year of birth missing
Incidents of violence against girls
Chinese deaf people
Tatar people